Khanak (also Romanized as Khānak) is a village in Kharrazan Rural District, in the Central District of Tafresh County, Markazi Province, Iran. At the 2006 census, its population was 242, in 92 families.

References 

Populated places in Tafresh County